Parornix extrema is a moth of the family Gracillariidae. It is known from the Russian Far East.

References

Parornix
Moths of Asia
Moths described in 2003